The noble mouse-like hamster or the noble calomyscus, (Calomyscus grandis) is a species of mouse-like hamster from Iran.  It is the largest species of Calomyscus and was initially described as a subspecies of  Calomyscus bailwardi. The animal is found in the region near Tehran and is identifiable based on its large size (74–91 mm) and soft, buffy, brown dorsal pelage. Musser and Carleton recognized C. grandis as a distinct species.

References

Mouse-like hamsters
Mammals described in 1973